Ricardo da Silva Costa  (born 24 March 1965), known as just Ricardo, was a Brazilian football player.

Club career 
He mainly played for clubs in Brazil.

He also played for Pohang Steelers of the South Korean K League, then known as the POSCO Atoms.

References

External links 
 
 Profile at Playmakers

1965 births
Living people
Association football defenders
Brazilian footballers
Brazilian expatriate footballers
Pohang Steelers players
K League 1 players